Saint Georges Road is the nineteenth studio album by Australian blues rock band, The Black Sorrows. The album was released on 10 September 2021. The album sees the band reunite with English producer Peter Solley, who produced Jo Jo Zep & The Falcons' 1979 album, Screaming Targets, which featured Joe Camilleri's first Top 40 hits "Hit and Run"  and "Shape I'm In".

The album will be supported with Australian Livin' Like Kings tour.

Reception
Jeff Jenkins from Stack Magazine said "Saint Georges Road is sophisticated, soulful and superb, a crowning moment in a career that refuses to look back." The Australian called it the group's "most accessible album yet."

Track listing
 "What Stephanie Knows"
 "What's Taken Your Smile Away"
 "Livin' Like Kings"
 "Saint Georges Road"
 "Another Blue Day"
 "Chiquita"
 "Holy Man"
 "Revolutionary Blues"
 "My Heart Don't Feel a Thing"
 "Only Got Yourself to Blame"
 "King Without a Throne"
 "Out of Your Mind" (Collectors Edition Track)
 "Holy Man" (demo) (Collectors Edition Track)
 "It's Your Fault (I Cant Get Back to Sleep)" (Collectors Edition Track)
 "Revolutionary Blues" (demo) (Collectors Edition Track)
 "Sittin' on Top of the World" (Collectors Edition Track)

Charts

Weekly charts

Year-end charts

Release history

References

2021 albums
The Black Sorrows albums